La jefa del campeón (English title: Heart of a Champion) is a Mexican telenovela produced by Roberto Gómez Fernández that premiered on 11 June 2018, on Las Estrellas and concluded on 2 September 2018. It stars África Zavala and Carlos Ferro. In the United States it premiered on UniMás on 10 July 2018 and ended on 10 October 2018.

Plot 

Tita Menchaca (África Zavala) is a woman of limited resources, determined and very committed to moving forward with her children; Rey and her step-daughter, Fabiola. When she was abandoned by her husband Waldo (Alberto Agnesi), she moved to the capital to reorganize her life as a single mother. With the passage of time and hope, her son Rey dreams of being one of the best footballers in the country, which drives Tita to do everything possible to help him achieve his dream, no matter how difficult it will be.

Cast 
 África Zavala as Renata "Tita" Menchaca
 Carlos Ferro as Daniel "La Bomba" Rodríguez
 Enrique Arrizon as Reinaldo "Rey" Bravo Menchaca
 Luca Valentini as Child Rey
 Vanessa Bauche as Martina Morales
 Dagoberto Gama as El Coronel
 José Carlos Rodríguez as Sergio "Checo" Coyote
 Claudia Ramírez as Nadia Padilla de Linares
 Marisol del Olmo as Salomé Salas
 Luis Gatica as Emiliano
 Héctor Kotsifakis as Dante Chimal
 Zaide Silvia Gutiérrez as Sara
 Édgar Vivar as Pedro
 Alberto Agnesi as Waldo Bravo
 Alejandra Robles Gil as Fabiola Bravo Mendez
 Shaula Ponce De León as Child Fabiola
 Gemma Garoa as Beba
 Adalberto Parra as El Chino
 Mario Zaragoza as Arnulfo
 Raúl Coronado as Delfino
 Axel Rico as Froylán
 Andrea Guerrero as Maika
 Josh Gutiérrez as Matías
 Fernanda Urdapilleta as Valeria
 Victoria Viera as Child Valeria
 Sofía Campomanes as Frida
 Johana Zarzar as Child Frida
 Patricia Martínez as Malena
 Gina Pedret as Inés
 Lalo Palacios as Gonzo Coyote
 Ricardo Zertuche as Child Gonzo
 David Caro Levy as Quique
 André Real as Child Quique
 Marcela Ruiz Esparza as Karina
 Rodrigo Virago as Arsenio
 Quetzalli Cortés as Celso
 Axel Trujillo as Aníbal
 Cristian Ramos as Joel
 Nuria Gil as Rufis
 Federico Espejo as Nelson
 Alejandra Ambrosi as Ángela
 Marco Antonio Tostano as José Antonio

Production 
On 23 April 2018, Mexican television company Televisa stated filming began of the Mexican version of the Colombian telenovela La mamá del 10. Roberto Gómez Fernández executive producer of the telenovela, created the telenovela in order to support the 2018 FIFA World Cup. The adaptation for Mexico is made by Ximena Suárez and Julián Aguilar, while the direction is in charge of Walter Doehner and Víctor Herrera.

Ratings

Mexico ratings 
 
}}

U.S. ratings 
 
}}

Episodes

Awards and nominations

References

External links 
 

2018 Mexican television series debuts
2018 Mexican television series endings
2018 telenovelas
Mexican telenovelas
Televisa telenovelas
Mexican LGBT-related television shows
Mexican television series based on Colombian television series
Spanish-language telenovelas
2010s LGBT-related drama television series